Nitzanei Sinai ( or ), also known as Kadesh Barnea, is a community settlement in the western Negev desert in Israel. Located near Nitzana, it falls under the juridisction of Ramat HaNegev Regional Council.

History 

The settlement was occupied by Israel in 1980 and moved to its present site in 1986 following the Egypt–Israel peace treaty. It was named for its proximity to the Sinai, as well as after biblical Kadesh Barnea, one of the stations on the Israelites' journey during the Exodus.

Olive cultivar 
Barnea is a modern dual-purpose olive cultivar bred originally from Kadesh Barnea in southern Israel to be disease-resistant and to produce a generous crop. The oil has a strong flavour with a hint of green leaf. Barnea is widely grown in Israel (especially in the south) and in the southern hemisphere, particularly in Australia and New Zealand.

References 

Community settlements
Populated places in Southern District (Israel)
Populated places established in 1980
1980 establishments in Israel